Flection or flexion may refer to:
 The action of bending or the state of being bent
 Flexion, the action of bending a joint using a flexor muscle
 Curvature, the deviation from straightness
 Inflection, the modification of a word to express a grammatical meaning

See also 
 Flexure (disambiguation)